Battle Creek is an American comedy-drama television series that premiered on CBS on March 1, 2015, as a weekly show broadcast on each Sunday. Starring Josh Duhamel and Dean Winters, the show followed the mismatched partnership of a police detective and FBI agent in Battle Creek, Michigan. CBS announced on May 8, 2015, after only 9 episodes had aired, that Battle Creek would end after 13 episodes.

Cast

Main
 Josh Duhamel as Special Agent Milton 'Milt' Chamberlain
 Dean Winters as Detective Russell 'Russ' Agnew
 Aubrey Dollar as Office Manager Holly Dale
 Edward "Grapevine" Fordham Jr. as Detective Aaron 'Funk' Funkhauser
 Kal Penn as Detective Fontanelle 'Font' White
 Janet McTeer as Commander Kim 'Guz' Guziewicz

Recurring
 Liza Lapira as Detective Erin 'E' Jacocks
 Damon Herriman as Detective Niblet
 Meredith Eaton as Meredith Oberling, BCPD's medical examiner

Guests
 Patton Oswalt as Battle Creek's unorthodox mayor, Scooter Hardy (in "Cereal Killer")
 Peter Jacobson as Darrel Hardy, the mayor's brother and chief of staff (in "Cereal Killer")
 Candice Bergen as Constance Agnew, a convicted con artist and Russ' mother (in "Mama's Boy")
 Dan Bakkedahl as Barclay Spades (in "Gingerbread Man")
 Robert Sean Leonard as Brock (in "Sympathy for the Devil")
 Joey Haro as Roger (in "Sympathy for the Devil")

Development and production
In September 2013, Sony Pictures Television announced that it struck a deal with CBS to produce a new television series created by Vince Gilligan titled Battle Creek based on a script written by Gilligan ten years prior. Despite the name, establishing shots and location shots were not shot in Battle Creek, Michigan. However most of the scenes in the opening credits were filmed in Battle Creek. The main actors visited Battle Creek, Michigan, in the summer of 2014 to get a feel of the location, people, and especially the police department.

CBS ordered thirteen episodes, all of which it guaranteed to air. It premiered on CBS on March 1, 2015. On May 8, 2015, the network announced that Battle Creek would not be renewed for a second season. The series ended on May 24, 2015.

Episodes

Season 1 (2015)

References

External links
Official website
 

2010s American comedy-drama television series
2010s American crime drama television series
2010s American police comedy television series
2015 American television series debuts
2015 American television series endings
CBS original programming
English-language television shows
Television series created by Vince Gilligan
Television series by CBS Studios
Television series by Sony Pictures Television
Television shows set in Michigan